Gelanesaurus is a genus of lizards in the family Gymnophthalmidae. The genus contains two species, which are native to Colombia and Ecuador. Both species were included in the genus Potamites until 2016 when they were moved to the genus Gelanesaurus.

Species
The genus Gelanesaurus contains two species which are recognized as being valid.

Gelanesaurus cochranae  – Cochran's neusticurus
Gelanesaurus flavogularis 

Nota bene: A binomial authority in parentheses indicates that the species was originally described in a genus other than Gelanesaurus.

References

 
Taxa named by Omar Torres-Carvajal
Taxa named by Simón E. Lobos
Taxa named by Pablo J. Venegas
Taxa named by German Chavez
Taxa named by Vanessa Aguirre-Peñafiel
Taxa named by Daniel Zurita
Taxa named by Lourdes Y. Echevarría